Lienardia planilabrum is a species of sea snail. It is a marine gastropod mollusk in the family Clathurellidae.

References

planilabrum